The year 1989 in archaeology involved some significant events.

Explorations

Excavations
 Excavations are made at the Temple of Poseidon (near Corinth, also known as the Temple of Isthmia) by University of Chicago.
 Vimala Begley commences excavations at Arikamedu in Puducherry.
 Rescue excavation at Updown early medieval cemetery in Kent, England, led by Brian Philp uncovered 41 previously unexcavated graves.

Finds
January - Skeleton of Buhl Woman (c. 10,675 BP) found in Idaho.
June 8 - Wreck of German battleship Bismarck (scuttled in 1941) discovered in North Atlantic by Robert Ballard.
Wreck of German Type UC II submarine SM UC-70 (depth-charged in 1918) discovered off the North Yorkshire coast of England.
Yoshinogari Ruins discovered at Kanzaki, Kyūshū, Japan; goods and building are mainly Yayoi period.
Remains of The Rose and Globe Theatres discovered in London.
Luxor statue cache in courtyard of Amenhotep III's colonnade of the Temple of Luxor, including a  pink quartzite statue of the king on a sled wearing the Double Crown.
Laguna Copperplate Inscription found in the Philippines.
Oldest known wing bone of the great auk found at Eartham Pit, Boxgrove in England.

Publications
 Richard Hodges - The Anglo-Saxon Achievement: Archaeology & the Beginnings of English Society. Duckworth. 
 Stuart Piggott - Ancient Britons and the Antiquarian Imagination: Ideas from the Renaissance to the Regency. Thames and Hudson. .

Births

Deaths

References

Archaeology
Archaeology
Archaeology by year